Million Dollar Ransom is a 1934 American drama film directed by Murray Roth and written by William R. Lipman and Ben Ryan. The film stars Phillips Holmes, Edward Arnold, Mary Carlisle, Wini Shaw, Andy Devine and Robert Gleckler. The film was released on September 1, 1934, by Universal Pictures.

Premise
To stop his mother from marrying a man he does not like, a young millionaire hires an ex-con help him fake his own kidnapping.

Cast 
Phillips Holmes as Stanton Casserly
Edward Arnold as Vincent Shelton
Mary Carlisle as Francesca Shelton
Wini Shaw as Babe
Andy Devine as Careful
Robert Gleckler as 'Doc' Carson
Marjorie Gateson as Elita Casserly
Edgar Norton as Meigs
Bradley Page as Easy

References

External links 
 

1934 films
American drama films
1934 drama films
Universal Pictures films
American black-and-white films
Films scored by Edward Ward (composer)
Films directed by Murray Roth
1930s English-language films
1930s American films